Aquatics at the 1997 Southeast Asian Games included swimming, diving, synchronized swimming and water polo events and were held at Senayan Aquatic Centre in Jakarta, Indonesia. Aquatics events were held between 11 October to 16 October.

Medal winners

Swimming
Men's events

Women's events

Diving

Synchronized swimming

Water polo

References

1997 Southeast Asian Games events
1997